Grootfaam is a surname, likely of Dutch origin. Notable people with the surname include:

Dammyano Grootfaam (born 1991), Dutch former professional footballer
Jay-Ronne Grootfaam (2000-2019), better known as RS, Dutch drill rapper
Melvin Grootfaam (born 1990), Dutch footballer
Orlando Grootfaam (1974-2019), Surinamese professional footballer